KKOT (93.5 FM) is a radio station licensed to Columbus, Nebraska, United States. The station airs a classic hits format and is currently owned by Alpha Media through licensee Digity 3E License, LLC.

The station was launched as KTTT-FM, sister station to KTTT AM, in 1969. The calls were changed in 1985 to KWMG and in 1993 to KKOT.

References

External links
KKOT's website

KOT
Classic hits radio stations in the United States